Tibia fusus, common name Spindle tibia or Shinbone Tibia Gastropod, is a species of large sea snail, a marine gastropod mollusk in the family Strombidae, the true conchs.

Distribution
This species is widespread in Eastern Indian Ocean and Western Pacific, from Indochina, China Sea, southern Japan and the Philippines to the Banda Sea, Indonesia, Australia and Oceania.

Habitat
Most Tibia fusus live in tropical offshore waters where there is plenty of sand, at depths of 5 to 50 m.

Description
These shells are large, spindle-shaped with moderately convex turns and an extremely long, thin and slightly curved siphonal canal. The basic color ranges from straw yellow to reddish-beige. The aperture is ovate and white inside, with 6 fingerlike growths on the outer lip.

It is a fairly common species where it occurs, but because of its attractive appearance, it is highly sought after by shell collectors.

Life cycle
Embryos develop into free-swimming planktonic marine larvae (trochophore) and later into juvenile veligers.

Bibliography
 Walls, J.G. (1980). Conchs, tibias and harps. A survey of the molluscan families Strombidae and Harpidae. T.F.H. Publications Ltd, Hong Kong.
 Koichiro Masuda & CHi-Yue Huang, 1993. Miocene Gastropoda and Scaphopoda in the western foothills of northern Taiwan. Journal of the Geological Society of China (1993)
Springsteen, F.J. & Leobrera, F.M. 1986. Shells of the Philippines

References

External links
 Encyclopedia of life
 Stromboidea

Rostellariidae
Gastropods described in 1758
Taxa named by Carl Linnaeus